The Wuikinuxv-Kitasoo-Nuxalk Tribal Council, formerly the Oweekeno-Kitasoo-Nuxalk Tribal Council, is a First Nations tribal council comprising band governments of three indigenous peoples of the Central Coast region of British Columbia, Canada.  The tribal council, composed of three band governments, spans four different cultures and languages: 
the Wuikinuxv or Oweekeno, based at Rivers Inlet
the Nuxalk, based at Bella Coola
the joint Tsimshian-Heiltsuk community people known as the Kitasoo/Xaixais Nation whose village is located at Klemtu.

References
WKNTC Website
Indian and Northern Affairs Canada Tribal Council Detail

Tsimshian governments
Nuxalk
Wuikinuxv
Heiltsuk
Central Coast of British Columbia
First Nations tribal councils in British Columbia